Władysław Dobrzaniecki (24 September 1897 in Zielinka near Borszczów – 4 July 1941 in Lemberg, District of Galicia) was a Polish physician and surgeon.

Władysław was since 1936 head of the Saint Zofia Children Hospital in Lwów, and since 1938 titular professor of surgery at the Lviv University. He was a precursor of plastic surgery in Poland.

He was murdered by the Germans in Lviv during the Massacre of Lvov professors.

1897 births
1941 deaths
People from Ternopil Oblast
People from the Kingdom of Galicia and Lodomeria
Polish Austro-Hungarians
Polish plastic surgeons
Academic staff of the University of Lviv
Polish people of the Polish–Ukrainian War
Deaths by firearm in Poland
Victims of the Massacre of Lwów professors